William H. (aka Bill) Rastetter (born 1948), a scientist, entrepreneur and venture capitalist, is the chair  of Neurocrine Biosciences, of Fate Therapeutics, and of Daré Bioscience, Inc. in San Diego, California. He is a founding board member and investor in GRAIL, Inc. in Menlo Park, California, and served for a period as the company's interim CEO (2017) and chair (2017-2018). Rastetter is also
a director of Regulus Therapeutics and Entos, Inc..
He was a partner in the venture firm Venrock (2006-2013), and a trustee at Caltech (2015-2018).
He has served as a director (1998-2016) and as chair of Illumina (2005-2016).
He advised SVB Leerink (2014-2019) and currently advises Illumina Ventures (since 2016).

Between 1986 and 2003, Rastetter held positions as President, Chief Executive Officer, Chief Financial Officer and director at IDEC Pharmaceuticals. At IDEC, Rastetter was a co-inventor of and developed Rituxan, the first  monoclonal antibody (MAB) to be approved by the U.S. FDA for cancer therapy. In 2003, Idec merged with Biogen to form the third largest biotech firm in the United States. Rastetter was Executive Chair of the new company, Biogen IDEC, from 2003 to 2005.

Rastetter was also a co-founder, interim CEO and chairman of Receptos, Inc. a biopharmaceutical company which was bought by Celgene Corporation in 2015.

Rastetter has been described as an "omnipotent biotech force" and by Alnylam Pharmaceuticals CEO John Maraganore as an "industry legend" who has deep biotechnology expertise.

Education
William Harry Rastetter was born in 1948 in Panama to Richard William Rastetter and Margaret Van Oot Rastetter of Williamsburg, Va. Richard William Rastetter was a commander in the United States Navy and later worked for the State Department.  As a result, the family lived in several countries, including Panama, Brazil, and Costa Rica. Rastetter is bilingual in English and Spanish.  Rastetter's mother, Margaret Van Oot Rastetter, was an oil painter. She encouraged his interest in the sciences.

Rastetter graduated from high school in Bethesda, Maryland.
He went to MIT for his undergraduate work, receiving a bachelor of science (SB) in chemistry in 1971. He earned a master's (MA) in 1972 and a doctoral degree (PhD) in organic chemistry in 1975 from Harvard University.
His advisor at Harvard was Nobel Prize winner Robert Burns Woodward.
While at Harvard, Rastetter taught undergraduate classes.

Personal life
William Rastetter was married to illustrator Lucy Sands Dillon on August 21, 1982.
He moved to Rancho Santa Fe in 1987.

William Rastetter later married Marisa Gard, an attorney and triathlete who has been featured on the cover of USA Triathlon Life.  Marisa Gard Rastetter is an attorney at the nonprofit San Diego Volunteer Lawyer Program, and runs legal clinics for low-income people, dealing with legal matters as diverse as domestic violence, guardianship, and issues relating to HIV and AIDS.

Career

MIT
Rastetter was an associate professor of chemistry at MIT. He held the Firmenich Endowed Chair (1979–1981) and an Alfred P. Sloan Fellowship (1980–1982).

Genentech Inc.
Rastetter joined Genentech Inc. in 1982 as a scientist, and directed its Biocatalysts and Chemical Sciences Groups from 1982 to 1984.
From 1984 to 1986, he served as Director of Corporate Ventures at Genentech.

IDEC Pharmaceuticals / Biogen Idec
Rastetter joined IDEC Pharmaceuticals, which was founded in 1985, as of December 1986, shortly after funding of the Series A venture round.
In addition to being a director (1986-2003) and chair (1996-2003), he served as chief financial officer (1988–1993), and president and chief executive officer from 1986 to 2003.

While at  IDEC, Rastetter was a co-inventor of Rituxan, which it co-marketed with Genentech. Rituxan was the first monoclonal antibody (MAB) to be approved by the FDA (1997) for the treatment of cancer.

In 2003, Idec Pharmaceuticals merged with Biogen to form the third largest biotech firm in the United States.
Following the merger, Rastetter became the executive chair of the new company, Biogen IDEC (2003–2005).

LEERINK Partners
Rastetter served (2014-2019) as a Member of the Advisory Council for Leerink Partners LLC (now SVB Leerink), an investment bank focusing on healthcare. Other members included David Evans Shaw, James R. Tobin, David E.I. Pyott and Francois Nader.

Illumina Ventures
Rastetter serves as an adviser to Illumina Ventures, which focuses its investments in start-up companies driven by genomics and next generation sequencing technologies.
Rastetter served on the board of directors of Illumina, Inc. from 1998 to 2016, and as the non-executive chair of the Board of Directors of Illumina, Inc. from 2005 to 2016.

Venrock
Rastetter was a partner at the venture capital firm Venrock from 2006 until February 2013.

Receptos, Inc.
In 2007, Rastetter cofounded Receptos, Inc., a biopharmaceutical company.   Rastetter served as interim CEO of Receptos from May 2009 to December 2, 2010; and as a director and chair of the board from May 2009 to August 27, 2015.
Receptos was acquired by Celgene Corporation in 2015.

Fate Therapeutics
Rastetter joined Fate Therapeutics, Inc. on December 14, 2011 as a director and as chair of the board. Rastetter served as the Interim CEO at Fate Therapeutics from February 2012 to October 15, 2012, when Christian Weyer became president and CEO; Scott Wolchko is Fate's current president and CEO. Rastetter has continued as chair of the board of directors.

Neurocrine Biosciences, Inc.
Rastetter has been a Director at Neurocrine Biosciences, Inc. since February 8, 2010, and the chair of the board of Neurocrine since May 25, 2011.

Cerulean Pharma Inc. / Daré Bioscience 
Rastetter was involved in the funding of Cerulean Pharma, Inc. as early as 2009.  He became a Director of Cerulean Pharma in January 2014. He served as its Lead Independent Director from April 2014 to June 2016, and as chair of the board at Cerulean Pharma Inc. from June 2016 to July 2017.

Effective as of July 20, 2017, Daré Bioscience Operations, Inc. became a wholly owned subsidiary of Cerulean Pharma Inc., and Cerulean changed its name to Daré Bioscience, Inc.
Rastetter now serves on the board of directors and as chair of the board of  Daré Bioscience.

Regulus Therapeutics, Inc.
Rastetter was appointed to the board of directors at Regulus Therapeutics Inc. as of April 1, 2013.

Caltech
Rastetter served on the board of trustees of Caltech from October 28, 2015 to 2018.

GRAIL, Inc.
Rastetter serves on the board of GRAIL, Inc., a life sciences company in Menlo Park, California that focuses on early cancer detection using deep genome sequencing. Rastetter served as chair (2017-2018) and as interim CEO (2017) during a leadership transition at the company which resulted in the hiring of Jennifer Cook.
GRAIL's CEO is currently Hans Bishop; the company was a spinoff of Illumina and Google.

Photography
Rastetter has a lifelong interest in photography, which began at age 11, when his mother gave him a Kodak box camera. He experiments with techniques to overlay images and to take extremely long exposures of up to 12 minutes using medium and large format cameras such as the Hasselblad H5D-50c. He has exhibited at the Joseph Bellows Gallery and the Madison Gallery in La Jolla, California; at the Oceanside Museum of Art in Oceanside, California; and at The Ida and Cecil Green Faculty Club at the University of California, San Diego.

Awards
 2018, Biotechnology Heritage Award, Biotechnology Industry Organization (BIO) and Science History Institute
 2015, Lifetime Achievement Award, Corporate Directors Forum
 2015, Life Sciences Leadership Award, Pantheon DiNA Awards, California Life Sciences Association (CLSA)
 2007, CONNECT Entrepreneur Hall of Fame, San Diego
 2002, Jacob and Louise Gabbay Award in Biotechnology and Medicine
 1998, Ernst & Young Entrepreneur of the Year Award, Biotechnology, San Diego
Peer-Elected Awards from The Biotech Meeting at Laguna Niguel:
1998 Best of Biotech, New Therapeutic Product, Rituxan     
2001 Biotech Hall of Fame, Leading Company, IDEC Pharmaceuticals  
2002 Biotech Hall of Fame, Special Recognition for an Individual
2002 Best of Biotech, Best New Approved Product, Zevalin
2003 Biotech Hall of Fame, Scientific Achievement, shared with Drs. Anderson, Hanna and Grillo-Lopez

References

External links
 
 

1948 births
Living people
American scientists
Massachusetts Institute of Technology School of Science alumni
Harvard University alumni
American technology chief executives
American chief financial officers